Danupol Kaewkarn or Jae (birth 11 October 1959) is a Thai singer, musician, songwriter and former lead singer of Grand Ex' famous Thai string combo band during the years 1979–1988.

Biography 
Danupol Kaewkarn was born on October 11, 1959, at Chulalongkorn Hospital as the youngest child of five siblings.  As a young boy, Danupol received his primary education form several schools including Wat Khema Phirataram School and high school education from Horwang School.

Career 
Earlier in his career, Danupol started playing folk song whilst attended high school and was the first professional singer career at Love Coffee Shop (4th floor, Siam Center), subsequently playing at Birthday Cafe', the President Cinema. Until being contacted by Thanongsak Arphornsiri, or Aed the bassist of the band that was famous in that era, Grand Ex', to become the band vocalist to replaced Chamras Saewataporn the old lead singer who was resigned.

Danupol, joined Grand Ex' in the album Shy, the band's 4th album, which was released in July 1980 under the label Azona Promotion. with senior musicians whom joined the band at the same time was Chokdee Phak-poo or Tae

After the classical era members dispersed at the end of the Duang Duen album, the 14th studio album that was released in November 1984 under the new label, TSE Group, part of the Thai Rath Newspaper group.  Danupol, along with the other 3 members, Nakorn Vejsupaporn or Tong a guitarist and band leader, Prasit Chaiyatho, and Chokdee Pakpoo.  Together they have established a new music band called Grand Ex' Family, and released two albums with the band, Pink Heart, the 15th studio album and Sai Yai the 16th studio album, before leaving the band to become a solo artist. Danupol is the first solo artist in Thailand.

Solo artist 
Danupol signed the contract as a singer under the famous record label of that era, such as Nititad Promotion, and released an album of golden dreams on February 1, 1986, with The Ploy band, which he founded as a backup. This album was successful to the point of having to change the cover in May of the same year.

After releasing 8 albums with Nititad, consisted of 5 full albums and 3 special albums, Danuphon expired with Nititad in early 1991 and released his own record label under the name "Internal" has Henry Preecha-panich as the first artist, together with Nontiya Jiwbang-pa, Orawan Yenpoonsuk or Pum from the Sao Sao Sao band. Tuk Siriporn Yooyod and by myself. Including opening a recording studio at the same name, but not in operation for a short time, the music label closed down. As for the recording studio, the business was be operated for a while and eventually shut down.

In the year 2004, Danupol released a studio album "Can't help, not enough man", under the giant music label RS, after leaving the solo album for 9 years, but without success due to lack of promotion.

References

1959 births
Danupol Kaewkarn
Danupol Kaewkarn
Danupol Kaewkarn
Living people
Danupol Kaewkarn